Petar Nedeljković (9 August 1882 – 1 November 1955) was an army general in the Royal Yugoslav Army who commanded the 4th Army during the German-led invasion of Yugoslavia of April 1941 during World War II. Nedeljković's command consisted of three divisions, a brigade-strength infantry detachment, one horsed cavalry regiment and one infantry regiment. The 4th Army was responsible for the Yugoslav-Hungarian border and was deployed behind the Drava between Varaždin and Slatina.

Career
Nedeljković commanded a division in 1936, and was then appointed as Inspector of Cavalry. He was appointed to command the 3rd Army headquartered at Skopje in May 1939.

Notes

Footnotes

References

Books

Web

 
 

1882 births
Place of birth missing
1955 deaths
Place of death missing
Royal Yugoslav Army personnel of World War II
Army general (Kingdom of Yugoslavia)